Osceola County is a county located in the central portion of the U.S. state of Florida. As of the 2020 census, the population was 388,656. Its county seat is Kissimmee. Osceola County is included in the Orlando–Kissimmee–Sanford, Fla. Metropolitan Statistical Area.

Being 54.3% Hispanic, Osceola is one of three Hispanic-majority counties in Florida, owing to its large Puerto Rican American population. It also is the 12th-largest majority-Hispanic county in the nation.

Etymology
Osceola County is named for the Indian leader Osceola, whose name means "Black Drink Cry [Asi Yaholo]".

History
Osceola County was created in 1887. On July 21, 1821, Florida was divided into two counties, named Escambia County to the west and St. John's County to the east. In 1824, the southern part of St. John's County became Mosquito County, with Enterprise as the county seat. In 1844, Brevard County was carved out from Mosquito County. When Florida became a state in 1845, Mosquito County was renamed Orange County. On May 12, 1887, Osceola was named a county, having been created from both Orange and Brevard Counties. Osceola County reached all the way down to Lake Okeechobee until 1917 when Okeechobee County was formed.

Since the late 20th century, Osceola County has experienced a significant influx of migrants from the Commonwealth of Puerto Rico, the unincorporated territory of the United States, and in the 2000 U.S. Census Puerto Rican was the largest self-reported ancestry group.

Government
Osceola County is a charter county, and a subdivision within the State of Florida. Voters approved the County Charter in March 1992, and it took effect on October 1, 1992. The structure of County government under the charter does not depart dramatically from the structure of a County government outlined in the Florida Statutes.

Osceola County Government is governed by three sets of elected officials, each of which independently directs separate branches of County Government. These include: the five-member County Commission, five separate Constitutional Officers, and a number of Judicial Officers. Under State law, the County Commission is responsible for funding the budgets of all Osceola County Government, including the independently elected Constitutional Officers and Judicial Officers, as well as the Commission's own departments. Each independent officer has discretion to administer his or her own programs. The County Commission exercises oversight only over its own departments.

Osceola County has five electoral districts each represented by a commissioner. All the commissioners compose the Board of Commissioners that appoint a County Manager. There also is a Commission Auditor and County Attorney.

Legislature
Board of County Commissioners
 District 1 – Peggy Choudhry (D)
 District 2 – Viviana Janer (D)
 District 3 – Brandon Arrington (D)
 District 4 – Cheryl Grieb (D)
 District 5 – Ricky Booth (R)

Executive
 County Manager – Don Fisher
 Deputy County Manager - Beth Knight
 Assistant County Manager - Donna Renberg 
 Commission Auditor - Chijioke Horace Nwachukwu 
 County Attorney - Frank Townsend

Constitutional officers
 Sheriff – Marco Lopez (D)
 Property Appraiser – Katrina Scarborough (D)
 Clerk of the Circuit Court & County Comptroller – Kelvin Soto, Esq. (D)
 Supervisor of Elections – Mary Jane Arrington (D)
 Tax Collector – Bruce Vickers (D)
 Public Defender – Bob Wesley
 State Attorney – Monique Worrell

Geography

Adjacent counties
 Orange County – north
 Brevard County – northeast
 Indian River County – east
 Okeechobee County – southeast
 Highlands County – south
 Polk County – west
 Lake County – northwest

Transportation

Rail

CSX's A-line, formerly the Atlantic Coast Line Railroad mainline, and originally built by  the South Florida Railroad in the 1880s, runs through the urbanized northern part of the county. CSX has leased the line to the FDOT. Intercity passenger service is provided by Amtrak at Kissimmee station and commuter passenger service is operated by SunRail, with stops at Kissimmee and Poinciana.

Airports
 Kissimmee Gateway Airport

Major highways

  Interstate 4
  Florida's Turnpike
  State Road 417
  State Road 429
  Osceola Parkway
  US 441
 / US 17/92 (Orange Blossom Trail)
  US 192
  CR 15
  SR 60
 John Young Parkway

Demographics

As of the 2020 United States census, there were 388,656 people, 109,642 households, and 81,168 families residing in the county. There were  162,661 housing units at an average density of 122 per square mile (83/km2). The majority of Hispanics/Latinos in the county are Puerto Ricans, who account for an estimated 33.7% of the population and are the largest ancestral group in the county.

38.2% of the county population is affiliated with a religious congregation. There are 206 or more religious congregations in the county. 16.5% are Catholic; 1.3% are Mormons; 3.5% are Baptist, 3.7% are Pentecostal, 1.4% are Methodist, 8.3% are members of other Christian faiths, 0.1% are Jewish, 0.2% affiliate with an eastern faith, and 3.2% affiliate with Islam.

There were 111,539 households, 57% were married couples living together, 23% had a female householder with no spouse present, 7% had a male householder with no spouse present, and 13% were non-families. The average household size was 3.4 persons per household.

In the county, the population was spread out, with 12% being 0 to 9 years old, 15% 10 to 19, 14% 20 to 29, 15% from 30 to 39, 13% from 40 to 49, 11% 50 to 59, and 19% who were 60 years of age or older. The median age was 36 years. For every 100 females, there were 97.20 males. For every 100 females age 18 and over, there were 94.20 males.

The median income for a household in the county was $52,279. The per capita income for the county was $22,196. About 13.4% of the population were below the poverty line, including 18.00% of those under age 18 and 10.00% of those age 65 or over.

Education
The School District of Osceola County, Florida serves the county. The county is home to 47 schools, not including colleges.

Colleges
 Johnson University Florida
 Florida Technical College
 Heritage University & Seminary
 Stetson University
 Valencia College - Osceola Campus & Poinciana Campus

Libraries
There are currently six branches of the Osceola County Library System:

 Buenaventura Lakes Library - Kissimmee, FL
 Hart Memorial Library - Kissimmee, FL
 Kenansville Library - Kenansville, FL
 Poinciana Library - Kissimmee, FL
 St. Cloud Veterans Memorial Library - St. Cloud, FL
 West Osceola Library - Celebration, FL

The Hart Memorial Library is home to the Ray Shanks Law Library, and TechCentral the library system's "creative space".

History 
Until 1989, there was no independent Osceola Library System. Instead, Osceola patrons were taken care of by Orange County Library System. Before that, there were two libraries, which are still named after the original independent libraries, run by women's organizations: Veteran's Memorial in Saint Cloud and Hart Memorial Library in Kissimmee.

In 1910, land for the Hart Memorial Library was donated by a widow of a former Florida Governor, Carrie S. Hart. It was located on North Stewart Avenue in Kissimmee . In 1914, women pooled money together from themselves and other community members to build the actual building and Annie Palmer Fell, another widow of a prominent Florida man, donated furnishings and books from her personal collection to begin building inventory in the new library. In 1968, the location moved to a 4,000 square foot building on Broadway and Dakin. Hart Memorial Library is the Osceola headquarters and is now located in a 43,000 square building .

Veteran's Memorial Library was at first a reading room until enough funds were raised to build the first official location on Massachusetts Avenue in Saint Cloud. In the early 70's the location moved to a former SunBank location on 10th Street and New York Avenue. In 1995, this branch moved for its final time to a larger building on Indiana Avenue and 13th street where it is still located today.

The first Poinciana Branch was opened in 1988. It was a modular building and consisted of a 14,000 book collection. This branch was eventually moved into a larger location with a collection of 40,000 books and computer access for patrons.

Osceola Library Systems began as an independent organization on April 1, 1989.

In 1990, the Buenaventura Library opened.

In 1991, volunteers helped open the Kenansville Branch Library in a shared space with the old Kenansville school. During the 2004 hurricanes, the collection was a total loss. It was rebuilt in 2007 with a larger collection, including books, DVDs, and computer/wifi access.

Communities

Cities
 Kissimmee
 St. Cloud

Census-designated places

 Buenaventura Lakes
 Campbell
 Celebration
 Four Corners
 Poinciana
 Yeehaw Junction

Other unincorporated communities

 Bull Creek
 Deer Park
 Harmony
 Holopaw
 Kenansville
 Narcoossee
 Whittier – the hamlet along Harvey Road especially near its intersection with Whitman Road; Zip Code: 34739.

 Intercession City

Planned development
Currently, a new suburb is planned in Osceola County called Destiny. If completely built, it would house up to 240,000 residents.

Special districts
 Reedy Creek Improvement District
 Crescent Lake Common Facilities District

Former communities
 Apoxsee
 Illahaw
 Kicco
 Locosee
 Nittaw
 Runnymede
 Tohopkee

See also

 National Register of Historic Places listings in Osceola County, Florida

Notes

References

External links

 
 Kissimmee Convention & Visitors Bureau
 Kissimmee/Osceola County Chamber of Commerce
 Osceola County Guide
 Florida Association of Counties (FAC)

Government links/Constitutional offices
 Osceola County Charter
 Osceola County Government / Board of County Commissioners
 Osceola County Supervisor of Elections
 Osceola County Property Appraiser
 Osceola County Sheriff's Office 
 Osceola County Tax Collector
 Kissimmee Utility Authority (local power and Internet provider)

Library System
 Osceola Library System

Special Districts
 School District of Osceola County
 South Florida Water Management District
 St. Johns River Water Management District

Judicial branch
 Osceola County Clerk of Courts
 Public Defender, 9th Judicial Circuit of Florida serving Orange and Osceola Counties
 Circuit and County Court for the 9th Judicial Circuit of Florida

History
 Osceola County Collection on RICHES Mosaic Interface 

 
Florida placenames of Native American origin
Charter counties in Florida
1887 establishments in Florida
Counties in Greater Orlando
Populated places established in 1887
Hispanic and Latino American culture in Florida